Lukas Köhler (born 22 August 1986) is a German politician of the Free Democratic Party (FDP) who has been serving as a member of the Bundestag from the state of Bavaria since 2017.

Early life and education 
Born in München, Bavaria, Köhler passed his Abitur examination in Monheim am Rhein in 2005 and, after completing his mandatory civilian service, studied philosophy in Munich with a Baccalaureate degree and in London with a master's degree. From 2011 to 2015 he completed his dissertation at the Munich School of Philosophy. He then took over the management of the Center for Environmental Ethics and Environmental Education there.

Political career 
Köhler joined the Young Liberals and the FDP in 2011. From 2014 to 2017, he served as state chairman of the Young Liberals of Bavaria.

Since the 2017 elections, Köhler has been serving as a member of the German Bundestag. He is a member of the Committee on the Environment, Nature Conservation and Nuclear Safety, where he serves as his parliamentary group’s spokesman for climate policy. He is also member of the Parliamentary Advisory Board on Sustainable Development and a deputy member of the Committee on Human Rights and Humanitarian Aid. 

From 2019, Köhler joined forces with Danyal Bayaz on bringing together fellow parliamentarians from the FDP and the Green Party to explore options for a so-called Jamaica coalition government.

In the negotiations to form a so-called traffic light coalition of the Social Democrats (SPD), the Green Party and the FDP following the 2021 federal elections, Köhler led his party's delegation in the working group on environmental policy; his co-chairs from the other parties were Matthias Miersch and Oliver Krischer. 

Since 2021, Köhler has been serving as one of six deputy chairpersons of the FDP parliamentary group under the leadership of its chairman Christian Dürr.

Other activities 
 Federal Network Agency for Electricity, Gas, Telecommunications, Post and Railway (BNetzA), Alternate Member of the Advisory Board (since 2022)
 Energy and Climate Policy and Innovation Council (EPICO), Member of the Advisory Board (since 2021)
 Agora Energiewende, Member of the Council 
 German Industry Initiative for Energy Efficiency (DENEFF), Member of the Parliamentary Advisory Board
 Munich School of Philosophy, Member of the Board of Trustees
 Bill & Melinda Gates Foundation, Member of the Advisory Board of the Goalkeepers Initiative (2019–2022)

References

External links 

  
 Bundestag biography 
 

 

1986 births
Living people
Politicians from Munich
Members of the Bundestag for Bavaria
Members of the Bundestag 2021–2025
Members of the Bundestag 2017–2021
Members of the Bundestag for the Free Democratic Party (Germany)